Jerelyn Fields (born July 2, 1959), better known as Jere Fields, is an American former actress.

Early life and education 
Fields was born in Onslow County, North Carolina, and attended Saddleback High School in Santa Ana, California. She earned a Master of Social Work from the University of Southern California in 2014.

Career
As a child, she guest-starred on such iconic television programs as Gunsmoke and The Brady Bunch. She also starred on the children's educational TV show Curiosity Shop in 1971 and 1972 and did voice work for the animated series Kid Superpower Hour with Shazam! as well as Scooby and Scrappy-Doo. She also appeared in several of Rick James' videos. Additionally, she worked on the films Friday the 13th: A New Beginning (1985) and Body Slam (1986).

Since retiring from acting, Fields has worked as a clinical social worker.

Filmography

Film

Television

References

External links

Place of birth missing (living people)
Living people
Actresses from Santa Ana, California
American film actresses
American television actresses
American voice actresses
1959 births
21st-century American women